Volta may refer to:

Persons
 Alessandro Volta (1745–1827), Italian physicist and inventor of the electric battery, count and eponym of the volt
 Giovanni Volta (1928–2012), Italian Roman Catholic bishop
 Giovanni Serafino Volta (1764–1842) Italian priest, naturalist and paleontologist
 Massimo Volta (born 1987), Italian footballer
Leopoldo Camillo Volta (1751–1823) Italian librarian and historian of Mantua

Places
 Volta, California, a census-designated place in Merced County, California, US
 Volta Mantovana, an Italian municipality in the Lombardy region
 Porta Volta, a former city gate of Milan, Italy
 Volta Grande, a Brazilian municipality in the Minas Gerais state 
 Volta Redonda, a Brazilian municipality in the Rio de Janeiro state
 Upper Volta (disambiguation)
 Lake Volta, in Ghana
 Volta Region, in Ghana
 Volta River, primarily flowing in Ghana, with its headstreams:
 White Volta
 Red Volta
 Black Volta
 Volta (crater), a crater on the moon
 8208 Volta, a main belt asteroid

Technology and products
 Volta (microarchitecture), the initial codename for the microarchitecture to succeed the Pascal (microarchitecture) developed by Nvidia
 Volta Charging, American electric vehicle infrastructure company
 Microsoft Live Labs Volta, a web development toolset by Microsoft
 Toyota Alessandro Volta, a hybrid concept vehicle
 Volta, a brand of vacuum cleaners by Electrolux

Organisations
 Volta Laboratory and Bureau, research and philanthropic institutions created by Alexander Graham Bell in the US
 Volta Aluminum Company, a company based in Ghana
 Volta River Authority, the main electricity supplier in Ghana
 Volta Regional Museum, an ethnographic history museum in Ho, Ghana
 Volta Cinematograph, first cinema of Dublin. started by, among others, James Joyce
 Volta Trucks, an electric truck manufacturer
 Volta (Estonian company), factory in Tallinn, Estonia

Sports
 Volta a Portugal, an annual professional road bicycle race in Portugal
 Volta ao Algarve, an annual road bicycle racing stage race in the Algarve, Portugal
 Volta a Catalunya, an annual professional road bicycle race in Catalonia, Spain
 Volta a Lleida, a road cycling stage race held in the Lleida region of Spain
 Volta a la Comunitat Valenciana, a former road cycling stage race held in the Valencian Community, Spain
 Volta Feminina da República, a Brazil women's staged cycle race
 Volta ao Distrito de Santarém, an annual Portuguese road bicycle racing stage race in the Santárem district

Other uses
 Volta (album), a 2007 album by Björk
 Volta (dance), a Renaissance dance for couples
 Volta (literature), a point of dramatic change in a poem
 Una Volta, the 3rd album from the band DeVotchKa
 Volta (film), a 2004 Philippine movie
 Volta (TV series), a 2008 Philippine TV series based on its namesake 2004 movie
 Volta (Brescia Metro), a railway station in Brescia, Italy
 Volta Review, the journal of the Alexander Graham Bell Association for the Deaf and Hard of Hearing
 Volta bracket, a musical repeat sign
 Volta Prize, an award by the French government for scientific achievement in electricity
 Edison Volta Prize, a biannual award by the European Physical Society (EPS)
 Volta Conference, an interwar cycle of cultural meetings
 Villa Volta, an attraction in the amusement park Efteling in the Netherlands
 VOLTA (Cirque du Soleil), a touring big top show by Cirque du Soleil

See also
 The Mars Volta, an American musical group
 Volt, the derived unit for electric potential, named in honour of Alessandro Volta
 Voltaic (disambiguation)
 Voltaic pile, the first electrical battery
 Volta do mar, a navigational technique perfected by the Portuguese during the late fifteenth century
 Conan: Hall of Volta, a 1984 action/platform computer game